Racism and xenophobia have been reported and investigated in Sweden. Sweden has the most segregated labor market of people with foreign background in Europe, when measured against both high and low educational level by OECD statistics.  According to the European Network Against Racism, skin color, ethnic/religious background have significant impact on an individual's opportunities in the labor market.

Due to increased immigration from Muslim majority countries in the 21st century, islamophobia in Sweden has increased with anti-immigration views growing stronger in the country. The country also has recorded instances of antisemitism, which has also increased in recent years with the increased Muslim population targeting Jews. Several white supremacist and neo-Nazi organizations are also active in Sweden.

Islamophobia

The report Racism and Xenophobia in Sweden by the Board of Integration state that Muslims are exposed to the most religious harassment in Sweden. Almost 40% of the interviewed said they had witnessed verbal abuse directed at Muslims. Historically, attitudes towards Muslims in Sweden have been mixed with relations being largely negative in the early 16th century, improving in the 18th century, and declining once again with the rise of Swedish nationalism in the early 20th century. According to Jonas Otterbeck, a Swedish historian of religion, attitudes towards Islam and Muslims today have improved but "the level of prejudice was and is still high." Islamophobia can manifest itself through discrimination in the workforce, prejudiced coverage in the media, and violence against Muslims.

Neo-Nazism

Sweden is home to several white supremacist and neo-Nazi organizations, including:

 Legion Wasa
 Swedish Resistance Movement

Former organizations include:

 National Socialist Front
 White Aryan Resistance

Antisemitism

Following Germany and Austria, Sweden has the highest rate of antisemitic incidents in Europe, although the Netherlands has reported a higher rate of antisemitism for some years. A government commissioned study from 2006 estimated that 15% of Swedes agree with the statement: "The Jews have too much influence in the world today." A multinational public-opinion study that was carried out by the American Jewish Committee in March – April 2005 (Thinking about the Holocaust 60 Years Later) shows how the view that Jews exert “too much influence” on world events is more prevalent in Poland, Austria and Germany than in Sweden, but also indicates that Swedes agree with this statement to a similar extent as Americans and the British. In reference to the statement that the Jews “exploit” the Holocaust for their own purposes, the same study indicates that this view is more prevalent amongst Swedes than amongst Americans and the British but equally as prevalent amongst Austrians and the French. 5% of the total adult population and 39% of adult Muslims   "harbour systematic antisemitic views". The former prime minister Göran Persson described these results as "surprising and terrifying." However, the rabbi of Stockholm's Orthodox Jewish community, Meir Horden, said that "It's not true to say that the Swedes are anti-Semitic. Some of them are hostile to Israel because they support the weak side, which they perceive the Palestinians to be." Further, a new study conducted by the ADL showed greatly contrasting results with Swedish respondents indicating antisemitic tendencies among a mere 4% of the population.

A record of 60 antisemitic attacks were reported in 2012 in the city of Malmö, up from an average 22 in the two years before that. 35 cases were reported in the first half of 2013, making it on pace to break the record. The Jewish community say that radical members of the Muslim population in the city are responsible for most of the attacks. According to a survey conducted by the Fundamental Rights Agency, in 40% of serious anti semitic harassment incidents the perpetrator was identified as someone with a Muslim extremist view.

Sources

References

External links
 European network against racism
 "Swedish culture minister in 'racist cake' row", Al Jazeera, April 18,  2012
 "Swedish minister in 'racist cake' controversy", BBC News, April 18, 2012
 Swedish whiteness and Swedish racism Presentation by Tobias Hübinette at the No Border Camp 2012, Stockholm, June 21, 2012

 
Society of Sweden
Sweden